The team relay luge at the 2012 Winter Youth  Olympics took place on 17 January at the Olympic Sliding Centre Innsbruck.

Results
The event was started at 14:00

References

Team